Sulphur, Nevada, is a ghost town in Humboldt County, Nevada that was a Feather River Route station in the Black Rock Desert along the Kamma Mountains.

History
A post office was in operation at Sulphur intermittently between 1899 and 1953.  The community was named for deposits of sulphur near the original town site.

References

Black Rock Desert
Ghost towns in Humboldt County, Nevada